Khel Khel Mein is a 2021 Pakistani historical drama film directed and written by Nabeel Qureshi and produced by Fizza Ali Meerza. It stars Sajal Aly and Bilal Abbas Khan. The story of the movie is related to the Liberation War of Bangladesh, the country which was formerly known as East Pakistan. The film was theatrically released on 19 November 2021. The film revolves around a drama club in a university taking its production based on 1971 war event to a drama festival in Dhaka.

Plot
Khel Khel Mein revolves around the ever growing myths, mystery and mistrust after the Surrender of Pakistan. The film is a projection of the existing mindset and curiosity around the subject, which is interestingly knit into a journey of students exploring the history and making history by doing not the so obvious and expected. Instead following the path of mutual respect, love and peace for all.

Cast 
 Sajal Aly as Zara
 Bilal Abbas Khan as Saad
 Javed Sheikh as Sikandar Salman
 Marina Khan as Mrs. Haque
 Nazr Ul Hasan as Babu
 Manzar Sehbai as Karamullah
 Samina Ahmed as Zaib 
 Sheheryar Munawar
 Naveed Raza as Vikram
 Irfan Motiwala as Masdodi (Administrator)
 Zehra Nawab as Rukhsar
 Farhan Ally Agha as Waji
 Laila Wasti as Zara's Mother
 Reham Rafiq as Noorie
 Mojiz Hasan as Pervaiz
 Hina Rizvi as Aapa
 Hammad Sheikh as Umang Brohi
 Hussain Mohsin as Peter
 Ali Rehman as Ali
 Qudsia Ali as Aisha
 Aneesha Altaf as Sara
 Hassan Bin Javed as Saif
 Fayed Ali as Zafar
 Faham Usman as Happy (Team India)

Additionally, Ali Zafar makes a cameo appearance in the film.

Soundtrack

Release 

The teaser of the film was released on 30 October 2021. The teaser received mixed reviews due to the resemblance of the storyline with Bollywood's 2006 coming-of-age drama Rang De Basanti. The official trailer was released on 8 November 2021. The film was theatrically released nationwide on 19 November 2021 and was the first film to be released in the country after the COVID-19 lockdown.

Box office 

The film collected a total of PKR 25 million worldwide in its first week of release and a total of PKR 60 million in its entire theatrical run.
It was the first film to push open the local cinema market after COVID-19 lockdown.

Production 
On 26 February 2021, Sajal Aly and Bilal Abbas Khan shared on their social media handles that they were leading actors in the film. Besides, Aly and Khan Sheheryar Munawar joined the cast for an extended cameo appearance. The cast also includes veterans such as Samina Ahmed, Manzar Sehbai (who played the older version of Munawar), Marina Khan, Javed Sheikh and Farhan Ally Agha. Qureshi revelaed about the genre of the film that it will be a historical/ drama, much different to his previous films. On 11 July 2021, Qureshi shared on his social media handle that shooting of film has been completed and it has taken 50 days to complete.

Accolades

References

External links 
 

2021 films
2020s Urdu-language films
Films shot in Dhaka
Pakistani historical drama films
Urdu-language Pakistani films